Nezamabad (also Romanized as Nez̧āmābād; also known as Nizāmābād) is a village in Sheshdeh Rural District, Sheshdeh and Qarah Bulaq District, Fasa County, Fars Province, Iran. At the 2006 census, its population was 181, in 40 families.

References 

Populated places in Fasa County